Michal Barinka (born June 12, 1984 in Vyškov, Czechoslovakia) is a Czech professional ice hockey defenceman who currently plays for HC Kometa Brno of the Czech Extraliga. He was drafted 59th overall in the 2nd round of the 2003 NHL Entry Draft by the Chicago Blackhawks. He was traded to the Senators in a three-way deal on July 9, 2006, that sent Martin Havlat to the Chicago Blackhawks.

Career statistics

Regular season and playoffs

International

External links
 

1984 births
Living people
Binghamton Senators players
Chicago Blackhawks draft picks
Chicago Blackhawks players
Czech ice hockey defencemen
Motor České Budějovice players
HC Fribourg-Gottéron players
HC Vítkovice players
Ice hockey players at the 2014 Winter Olympics
Lokomotiv Yaroslavl players
Norfolk Admirals players
Olympic ice hockey players of the Czech Republic
Ottawa Senators players
People from Vyškov
SC Bern players
Sportspeople from the South Moravian Region
Czech expatriate ice hockey players in Russia
Czech expatriate ice hockey players in the United States
Czech expatriate ice hockey players in Switzerland